Olympiacos Football Club B, or simply Olympiacos B, is the reserve team of Greek club Olympiacos and plays in Super League Greece 2.

Stadium
The stadium that hosts in Olympiacos is the Rentis Training Centre with a capacity of 3,000.

Coach and staff
Ariel Ibagaza was appointed the coach in July 2021, with former Nottingham Forest youth coach Guilherme Ramos appointed his assistant in August 2021.

Players

Current squad

Out on loan

See also
:Category:Olympiacos F.C. B players

References

 
Football
Football clubs in Piraeus
Association football clubs established in 2021
2021 establishments in Greece
Greek B teams
Super League Greece 2 clubs